Simon Alexander Williams (born 17 October 1967) is a male British former shot putter and discus thrower. He was the gold medallist in the shot put at the 1990 Commonwealth Games. He also represented Great Britain in the discus at the 1991 World Championships in Athletics and the 1992 Summer Olympics.

He was a two-time champion in the shot put at the AAA Championships (1988 and 1989). He was the 1991 shot put champion at the NCAA Men's Outdoor Track and Field Championships, competing for Louisiana State University.

Career
Born in Edmonton, London, he began competing in throwing events as a teenager as a young member of Enfield and Haringey Athletic Club. In 1984 he was the champion in the shot put in the under-17s AAA section (outdoors and indoors) and the intermediate category champion at the English Schools Championships. He improved the following year to take the discus throw title at the AAA Outdoor Junior Championships, the shot put at the under-19s English Schools competition. He took a AAA indoor title in the shot put in 1986 and also retained his schools title. Internationally, he competed in the discus at the 1985 European Athletics Junior Championships, being eliminated in the qualifying round. He also competed in the shot put at the inaugural 1986 World Junior Championships in Athletics, placing twelfth overall.

Williams won his first senior national title in the shot put at the 1988 AAA Championships. He repeated that feat in 1989, defeating runner-up Matt Simson by nearly a metre. He began studying at Louisiana State University that year, competing in college athletics for their LSU Tigers team. In 1990 he was beaten to the AAA shot put title by Paul Edwards, but also made his first discus throw podium there by coming runner-up to Abi Ekoku. He was England's selection for the shot put at the 1990 Commonwealth Games in Auckland.

At the 1991 NCAA Men's Outdoor Track and Field Championships, Williams was an unexpected victor in the shot put, taking the title for Louisiana with his throw of  – the shortest winning mark since 1959. Turning to the discus, he was the top national thrower at the AAA Championships that year, although second to Austria's Werner Reiterer. This brought him his senior debut for Great Britain at the 1991 World Championships in Athletics.

He was beaten nationally at the 1992 AAA Championships, finishing behind Edwards in the shot and behind Ekoku in the discus. He was well down on his best there, however, managing only  in the qualifying round.

After his Olympic performance, he never again reached the same standard. He did not compete in the 1993 season and did not rank nationally at the AAA Championships in 1994 either. He focused mainly on discus after this point: he was third at the 1995 AAA Championships and runner-up to Robert Weir at the 1996 event, which was his final podium finish at the competition.

Personal bests
Shot put –  (1991)
Discus throw –  (1992)

National titles
Shot put
AAA Championships: 1988, 1989

International competitions

References

External links

Living people
1967 births
British male shot putters
English male shot putters
British male discus throwers
English male discus throwers
Commonwealth Games gold medallists for England
Commonwealth Games medallists in athletics
Athletes (track and field) at the 1990 Commonwealth Games
Olympic athletes of Great Britain
Athletes (track and field) at the 1992 Summer Olympics
LSU Tigers track and field athletes
Medallists at the 1990 Commonwealth Games